The following is a list of Maine state forests.

Maine state forests

See also
 List of U.S. National Forests

Maine
State forests